Corrour Bothy is a simple stone building on Mar Lodge Estate, Aberdeenshire, Scotland.

It is located below Coire Odhar between The Devil's Point and Cairn Toul on the western side of the River Dee in the Lairig Ghru.

The bothy is a single room with a fireplace and chimney in its northern gable. Its dimensions are 19.6 ft (6m) by 11.8 ft (3.6m) . There is a toilet in the wooden extension to the building. It is used as a mountain refuge and as a starting point for ascents of Munros including The Devil's Point, Cairn Toul, and Braeriach.

Name

In  the author gives the local pronunciation as Corower, but without explanation.

In spite of the earlier work  and his understanding of Gaelic—and its local dialect— suggest an alternative origin for the place name as a shelter for the currour or forester's assistant.

History
In  the author writes that the people of mar used Coirie Odhar as a summer shieling for their cattle in the early part of the nineteenth century, but in the later part "the area was kept clear for deer".

Deer watchers
The original bothy was built in 1877 to house a deer watcher during the summer, and it housed several including Charles Robertson, John Macintosh, and Frank Scott before the estate stopped using the bothy in the 1920s. In  the author gives some detail about its occupation by deer watchers, continuing:

An even earlier mention, from 1901, gives an account of passing Corrour Bothy:

Open bothy
Later in  the author writes that the last watcher at Corrour Bothy was Frank Scott who left in 1920. After then it then became a 'famous open bothy' with a visitor book being left there in 1928 by the Rucksack Club of University College, Dundee.

In 1949 the bothy was reconstructed by members of the Cairngorm Club, with help from a wide range of individuals and other mountaineering clubs.

Archaeologically, the site is complicated: close to the bothy there are stones in the ground that appear to have formed part of some earlier construction, perhaps the remains of the summer shieling-huts. In  the authors write that they found "the remains of a hut with stone-footings, which is set into the grassy slope a short distance south-east of the present hut."

Present
In  the author refers to the bothy's origin, its reconstruction in 1949 by the Cairngorm Club, and the fact that it is maintained by the Mountain Bothies Association. A composting toilet has been installed in the extension at the south gable end of the bothy.

Gallery

See also
 List of Mountain Bothies Association bothies
 Places, place names, and structures on Mar Lodge Estate

References

Sources

External links

 The Cairngorm Club's website
 The Mountain Bothies Association website
 A gallery of photographs by Joe Dorward

Places and place names on Mar Lodge Estate
Buildings and structures on Mar Lodge Estate
Cairngorms